Northern Thunderbird Air Inc or NT Air is a Canadian charter airline and medevac service based in Prince George, British Columbia.

History 
NT Air was formed in 1971 with the amalgamation of two of northern British Columbia's airlines: Northern Mountain Airlines and Thunderbird Airlines.

Northern Mountain Airlines began operations at Fort St. James in 1959. By 1971, they were one of the larger airlines in British Columbia. With a mixed fleet of Cessnas, DHC-2 Beavers, Beech 18s, Grumman Goose, and helicopters; Northern Mountain served Northern Canada including Alberta, Yukon and Northwest Territories. By spinning off its airplane division to merge with Thunderbird in 1971, Northern Mountain was able to concentrate its efforts on helicopters only and did so through 2000.

Thunderbird Airlines started in the early 1960s when it acquired the bush operations of Pacific Western Airlines in Prince George. From its base at Tabor Lake, Thunderbird operated Cessnas, Beavers and DHC Otters on floats and skis servicing the new town of Mackenzie and the northern villages and logging camps of Williston Lake. In the early 1970s, Thunderbird secured a subcontract from Pacific Western Airlines to service the smaller communities of B.C. to feed that traffic into PWA's jet aircraft at Prince George, Kamloops and Kelowna. The need for a hangar on the Prince George Airport to fulfill this contract was the catalyst for the merger talks that resulted in the formation of Northern Thunderbird Air in 1971.

Since its inception, Northern Thunderbird Air has adapted with the times and economic cycles with a fleet of 18 aircraft, three bases, 21 scheduled points and over 100 employees.

Sister airline 
Northern Thunderbird Air is the sister airline of Central Mountain Air, utilizing their large aircraft capability and bases in British Columbia and Alberta.

Services 

British Columbia
Prince George
Prince Rupert
Mackenzie
Ospika
Tsay Keh
Fort Ware
Smithers
Dease Lake
Vancouver
Sandspit
Alberta
Calgary
Edmonton

Fleet 
As of November 2022, Northern Thunderbird Air has the following aircraft registered with Transport Canada:

The Northern Thunderbird Beechcraft 1900D's bear the NTA paint scheme and logo but are dual registered with sister company Central Mountain Air.

Incidents and accidents
 On October 27, 2011, a Beechcraft King Air, serial number B-36, registered C-GXRX, crashed on Russ Baker Way next to Vancouver International Airport in Richmond, British Columbia as it was attempting to make a landing, killing the pilot, 44-year-old Luc Fortin. It had departed the airport earlier but turned around due to indications of an aircraft malfunction (the engine oil pressure indicator); it crashed about 900 metres short of the runway. Five of the nine passengers were seriously injured. On November 16, 2011, the co-pilot of the flight, 26-year-old Matt Robic, died as well.
 Two pilots died in 2005 when a twin-engined Northern Thunderbird King Air 200 (BB-190, C-FCGL) crashed near Squamish when the plane was transitioning from Vancouver to Prince George. The pilot flew up a valley and was in a steep climb trying to avoid terrain when the plane crashed.
 In 2001, a Northern Thunderbird single-engine Cessna 185 crashed north of Prince George while under government charter to do a wildlife survey. The pilot and passenger survived.

References

External links

NT Air Website
FlightSource.ca photos of NT Air aircraft

Regional airlines of British Columbia
Companies based in Vancouver
Prince George, British Columbia
Smithers, British Columbia
1971 establishments in British Columbia
Airlines established in 1971
Air ambulance services in Canada
Canadian companies established in 1971